Helmuth Gräff (born 12 April 1958 in Gars am Kamp) is an Austrian painter, poet and drawer. Gräffs painterly style is rooted on the one hand in the artistic heritage of Vincent van Gogh, and on the other hand he can also be regarded as a precursor or heritage of the Neuen Wilde.

Life 
Helmuth Gräff is the child of Rudolf Gräff and Leopoldine Gräff (born Kimmerl) from Vienna-Schwechat, who belongs to the family of former imperial judge Matthias Kimmerl of Kaiserebersdorf (1818–1883). Gräff was married first to Martina Maria Gach, daughter of the architect Richard Gach. His son Matthias Laurenz Gräff works also as an academic painter.

In his youth Helmuth Gräff had been drawing thousands of artworks and kept on practising until the age of 20 where he began to study at the Wiener Kunstschule by Fritz Martinz.  Between 1979 and 1983 he studied art at the Academy of Fine Arts Vienna of Gustav Hessings and later Friedensreich Hundertwassers masterclass of painting.

Since 1989 is Gräff self-employed as an academic painter, drawer and poet. The themes of his artworks are on the one hand compositions with spiritual and religious contents, and on the other hand works in the nature (Italy, France, Florida, Bali).

Gräff exhibited among others in the Palais Palffy, Palais Todesco and Museum of Young Art as well in the Leopold Museum Vienna. His artworks were auctionated at Dorotheum and Auktionshaus Im Kinsky.

Collections 
 Sammlung Dr. Rudolf Leopold (Leopold Museum), Vienna/AT 
 Museum/Sammmlung Heinz Angerlehner, Upper Austria/AT

Exhibitions 
Solo Exhibitions:
 2019 "Mein Leben für die Kunst", Kunstmuseum Waldviertel, Schrems, AT
 2016 "Unterwegs ...", Palais Todesco, Vienna/AT
 2014 "Memento mori", KunstSalon, Vienna/AT
 2011 "La pura women's health resort kamptal", Gars am Kamp/AT
 2010 "Intarsien - Eine malerische Rundreise", Palais Palffy, Vienna/AT
 2010 "Frühlingskantate", Salon - Galerie Cornelia Mensdorff-Pouilly, Vienna/AT
 2010 "Gräff meets OK", Oskar Kokoschka-Dokumentationszentrum, Pöchlarn/AT
 2008 "Sunloft Center" und Wyvern Hotel, Punta Gorda, Florida/USA
 2008 "Zwischen den Welten", Dommuseum, Vienna/AT
 2008 "Zwischen den Welten", Buchpräsentation und Ausstellung, MOYA - Museum of Young Art, Vienna/AT
 2007 Galerie Weihergut, Salzburg/AT

Group Exhibitions:
 2015: "Matthias Laurenz Gräff und Helmuth Gräff. Zwischen den Welten - Zwischen den Generationen", Galerie Daliko, Krems an der Donau
 2011 "The exitement continues - Zeitgenössische Kunst aus der Sammlung Leopold II", Leopold Museum, Vienna/AT
 2011 "Gräff trifft Seitz", Exhibition with Friedrich Martin Seitz, The land of Lower Austria-Ausstellungsbrücke, St. Pölten/AT

Literature 
 Heinrich Fuchs, Die österreichischen Maler des 20. Jahrhunderts. Ergänzungsband 1, p. 69
 Helmuth Gräff. Edition Thurnhof, Heft No 5, anlässlich der Personalausstellung in der Horner Galerie Thurnhof, 1990, 20 pages.
 Helmuth Gräff, Akt - Landschaft - Allegorie. Edition M wie Kunst in der Bibliothek der Provinz. Verlag für Literatur, Kunst und Musikalien, 2005, 102 pages. 
 Helmuth Gräff, Zwischen den Welten. Dionysisch - Apollinisch - Erde - Wasser - Feuer - Luft. Verlag Bibliothek der Provinz, 2008, 222 pages.

References

External links 
 
 Profile, artfacts.net; accessed 22 September 2015. 
 Profile, basis-wien.at; accessed 22 September 2015. 
 Literature about Helm uth Gräff at Deutsche Nationalbibliothek
 Helmuth Gräff at artnet.com
 Helmuth Gräff at Auction house Dorotheum 
 Helmuth Gräff at Auction house Palais Kinsky

1958 births
Living people
20th-century Austrian painters
Austrian male painters
21st-century Austrian painters
21st-century male artists
20th-century Austrian male artists